Tanychaeta is a genus of moths belonging to the subfamily Tortricinae of the family Tortricidae.

Species
Tanychaeta neanthes (Turner, 1933)

See also
List of Tortricidae genera

References

External links
tortricidae.com

Tortricinae
Tortricidae genera